Mária Bácskai (born 26 March 1938) is a Hungarian sprinter. She competed in the women's 4 × 100 metres relay at the 1960 Summer Olympics.

References

1938 births
Living people
Athletes (track and field) at the 1960 Summer Olympics
Hungarian female sprinters
Olympic athletes of Hungary
Place of birth missing (living people)
Olympic female sprinters